The fifth GeGeGe no Kitarō anime was aired from April 1, 2007 to March 29, 2009 on Fuji Television. It ran for 100 episodes and was produced by Toei Animation.

Episode list

References

2007